Yu Yuanyuan is the name of:

Yu Yuanyuan (weightlifter) (born 1993), Chinese female weightlifter
Yu Yuanyuan (handballer) (born 1995), Chinese female handballer